Neutral amino acid transporter B(0) is a protein that in humans is encoded by the SLC1A5 gene.

See also 
 Glutamate transporter
 Solute carrier family

References

Further reading 

 
 
 
 
 
 
 
 
 
 
 
 
 
 
 
 

Solute carrier family